The Instituto de Investigaciones en Matemáticas Aplicadas y en Sistemas, or IIMAS ("Applied Mathematics and Systems Research Institute") is the research institute of the UNAM in Mexico City which focuses on computer science, applied mathematics, and robotics and control engineering.

History

The IIMAS was founded as the Centro de Cálculo Electrónico (Electronic Calculation Center) in 1958 under the auspices of UNAM rector Nabor Carrillo Flores with the purpose of housing and operating the first mainframe acquired by the university. In 1973 the institute acquired its current name and refocused its primary activities from computing services to applied mathematics and computer science research. In the early nineties the IIMAS moved to its current home.

Staff

The IIMAS has an average of 60 researchers aided by 40 technical staff. It is currently headed by Héctor Benítez Pérez, Ph.D.

Location and facilities

The IIMAS is located in Ciudad Universitaria in Mexico City, nearby the Engineering School and the Science School.

It consists in two buildings, the second one built later on to host the graduate programs and the new library.

Graduate studies

The institute currently offers graduate programs in four areas conjointly with the schools of science and engineering, as well as with the Earth Sciences Institute. Graduates students may focus on engineering, computer science, applied mathematics, or Earth sciences.

Current research

Research is divided among six departments:

Mathematics and mechanics
Mathematical physics
Mathematical modeling of social systems
Probability and statistics
Computer science
Computer systems and automation engineering

References

External links 
IIMAS homepage

National Autonomous University of Mexico